Storsåtklubben Ridge is a ridge,  long, located  northeast of Mount Hansen in the Mittlere Petermann Range, in the Wohlthat Mountains of Queen Maud Land. It was discovered and plotted from air photos by the  German Antarctic Expedition of 1938-39 and replotted from air photos and surveys by the Norwegian Antarctic Expedition in 1956–60, and named Storsåtklubben ("the large haystack mallet").

References

Ridges of Queen Maud Land
Princess Astrid Coast